Ashley C. Ford is an American writer, podcaster and educator who discusses topics including race, sexuality, and body image. She is the author of the New York Times best-selling memoir, Somebody's Daughter. She has been the host of five podcasts and has written or guest-edited for publications including The Guardian, Elle, BuzzFeed, and New York. In 2017, Forbes named her one of their "30 Under 30 in Media".

Early life and education 
Ford is a native of Fort Wayne, Indiana, where she was raised by her mother and grandmother. Ford graduated in 2011 with a degree in English from Ball State University in Muncie, Indiana.

Career

Writing 
Ford has written for publications including The Guardian, Elle, BuzzFeed, and Slate as well as lifestyle blog A Cup of Jo. In 2017, she was the  senior features writer at Refinery29, and that year, she was named as one of Forbes "30 Under 30 in Media".

Much of her writing covers personal topics, including her life as a Black, queer writer; her history as a survivor of sexual assault; and her experiences with a family member in prison for most of her childhood. Ford's essay "My Father Spent 30 Years in Prison. Now He's Out." was named on Longreads' Best of 2017 list. She considers the writer Roxane Gay a mentor.

She was announced as a Time100 Talks correspondent in August 2020.

Somebody's Daughter 

Her debut book Somebody's Daughter was released on June 1, 2021, as "An Oprah Book" through Oprah Winfrey's publishing imprint at Flatiron Books. The book is a memoir, focusing on her difficult upbringing and her often fraught relationships with her parents, in particular her mother. Throughout her childhood, her father was incarcerated and the book explores the ways the formative conditions that created for her and her mother have "shaped her understanding of childhood, authority, forgiveness and freedom."

Podcasting 
Ford is the host of Brooklyn-based television program and podcast 112BK, has hosted the BuzzFeed News podcast Profile, and was previously the host of the first season of Audible.com's interview series Authorized.

Ford is the host of the short fiction podcast, The Chronicles of Now, co-hosts the HBO companion podcast Lovecraft Country Radio, and is the former host of Mastercard's Fortune Favors the Bold.

Acting 
In 2018, Ford played the narrator in a stage production of The Nightmare Before Christmas at the New York cabaret Feinstein's/54 Below.

Activism 
Ford has used social media to drive fundraising campaigns for charitable causes, being credited for helping to raise $450,000 for the Ferguson Municipal Public Library in Ferguson, Missouri, in 2014 and over $100,000 to pay off school lunch debts in 2017.

Personal life 
Ford is married to the writer Kelly Stacy. They have a chocolate Labrador named Astro Renegade Ford-Stacy. Ford identifies as queer and credits her time at Ball State as one of the places she was able to explore her sexuality.

References

External links

 

Year of birth missing (living people)
Living people
21st-century American memoirists
American women podcasters
American podcasters
21st-century American women writers
American LGBT writers
African-American women writers
Ball State University alumni
LGBT people from Indiana
Writers from Fort Wayne, Indiana
BuzzFeed people
Queer women
21st-century African-American people
African-American memoirists
American women memoirists
21st-century African-American women
21st-century LGBT people